The 1931 All-Pacific Coast football team consists of American football players chosen by various organizations for All-Pacific Coast teams for the 1931 college football season. The organizations selecting teams in 1934 included the Associated Press (AP), the Newspaper Enterprise Association, and the United Press (UP).

All-Pacific Coast selections

Quarterback
 Gaius Shaver, USC (AP-1; UP-1)
 Orville Mohler, USC (NEA-1)

Halfbacks
 Bud Toscani, St. Mary's (AP-1; UP-1)
 Erny Pinckert, USC (AP-1; NEA-1; UP-1) (College Football Hall of Fame)
 Merle Hufford, Washington (NEA-1)

Fullback
 Ralston "Rusty" Gill, California (AP-1; NEA-1; UP-1)

Ends
 Ralph Stone, California (AP-1; NEA-1; UP-1)
 Leonard Wellendorf, UCLA (AP-1)
 Ray Sparling, USC (UP-1)
 Garrett Arbelbide, USC (NEA-1)

Tackles
 Paul Schwegler, Washington (AP-1; NEA-1; UP-1) (College Football Hall of Fame)
 Ernie Smith, USC (AP-1)
 Bill Morgan, Oregon (UP-1)
 Turk Edwards, Washington State (NEA-1) (College and Pro Football Halls of Fame)

Guards
 Johnny Baker, USC (AP-1; NEA-1; UP-1) (College Football Hall of Fame)
 Bill Fisher, St. Mary's (AP-1; UP-1)
 Bill Corbus, Stanford (NEA-1) (College Football Hall of Fame)

Centers
 Stan Williamson, USC (AP-1; NEA-1; UP-1)

Key

AP = Associated Press

NEA = Newspaper Enterprise Association, "picked by votes of sports writers on western NEA Service newspapers"

UP = United Press

Bold = Consensus first-team selection by at least two of the AP, NEA and UP

See also
1930 College Football All-America Team

References

All-Pacific Coast Football Team
All-Pacific Coast football teams
All-Pac-12 Conference football teams